Kang Myong-suk (born 9 November 1965) is a North Korean gymnast. She competed in six artistic gymnastics events at the 1980 Summer Olympics .

References

1965 births
Living people
North Korean female artistic gymnasts
Olympic gymnasts of North Korea
Gymnasts at the 1980 Summer Olympics
Place of birth missing (living people)
20th-century North Korean women